Spreading My Wings is the debut studio album from American rock band World Fire Brigade.  The album, starring percussionist Ken Schalk of Candiria, in addition to Andy Andersson, Mike McCready and Rob Caggiano on guitar, was released on 28 August 2012 via FrostByte Media.  The title track "Spreading My Wings", was published on 4 June 2012.

Track listing

References

External links 

Albums produced by Eddie Wohl
World Fire Brigade albums
2012 debut albums